Brayden is a male given name that is often referred to as Irish or Scottish. Alternative spellings include Braeden, Braden, Braydan, Braydon, Breadan and Bradon. Notable people called Brayden include:

Brayden Davidson (born 1997), Australian track and field athlete
Brayden Holt, recurring character in Wentworth Prison
Brayden Irwin (born 1987), Canadian ice hockey player
Brayden Lyle (born 1973), Australian rules footballer
Brayden Maynard (born 1996), Australian rules footballer
Brayden McNabb (born 1991), Canadian ice hockey player
Brayden Mitchell (born 1989), New Zealand rugby union footballer
Brayden Point (born 1996), Canadian ice hockey player
Brayden Schenn (born 1991), Canadian ice hockey player
Brayden Schnur (born 1995), Canadian tennis player
Brayden Thomas (born 1998), American football player
Brayden Wiliame (born 1992), Australian rugby league footballer

See also
Braden (disambiguation)
Bryden